= ZSC =

ZSC may refer to:

- Zamalek SC, an Egyptian sports club
- ZSC Lions, a Swiss ice hockey club
